Weststadt may refer to:

Weststadt (Braunschweig), a district of Braunschweig, Germany
Weststadt (Osnabrück district), a district of Osnabrück, Germany